The women's kumite 60 kilograms competition at the 2006 Asian Games in Doha, Qatar was held on 13 December 2006 at the Qatar SC Indoor Hall.

A total of eleven competitors from eleven countries competed in this event, limited to fighters whose body weight was less than 60 kilograms. 

Yuka Sato of Japan won the gold medal.

Schedule
All times are Arabia Standard Time (UTC+03:00)

Results

Main bracket

Repechage

References
Results

External links
Official website

Women's kumite 60 kg